Bordumsa-Diyun is one of the 60 constituencies of Legislative Assembly of Arunachal Pradesh and also the only unreserved constituency in the State's Vidhan Sabha. The current MLA of this constituency is Somlung Mossang, who is an independent candidate.

Bordumsa and Diyun are towns in the Indian state of Arunachal Pradesh. Changlang is the name of the district that contains Bordumsa and Diyun towns. Bordumsa and Diyun are revenue circles and together constitute form the constituency.

Members of the Legislative Assembly

Election results

2019

See also
List of constituencies of Arunachal Pradesh Legislative Assembly
Arunachal Pradesh Legislative Assembly

References

External links

Changlang district

Assembly constituencies of Arunachal Pradesh